CJK Symbols and Punctuation is a Unicode block containing symbols and punctuation used for writing the Chinese, Japanese and Korean languages. It also contains one Chinese character.

Block

The block has variation sequences defined for East Asian punctuation positional variants.

Chinese character 
The CJK Symbols and Punctuation block contains one Chinese character: . Although it is not covered under "Unified Ideographs", it is treated as a CJK character for all other intents and purposes.

Emoji
The CJK Symbols and Punctuation block contains two emoji:
U+3030 and U+303D.

The block has four standardized variants defined to specify emoji-style (U+FE0F VS16) or text presentation (U+FE0E VS15) for the
two emoji, both of which default to a text presentation.

History
In Unicode 1.0.1, two changes were made to this block in order to make Unicode 1.0.1 a proper subset of ISO 10646:
U+3004 IDEOGRAPHIC DITTO MARK was merged with U+4EDD (仝) in the CJK Unified Ideographs block, freeing up code point U+3004
U+32FF JAPANESE INDUSTRIAL STANDARD SYMBOL was moved from the Enclosed CJK Letters and Months block to U+3004 (〄)

The following Unicode-related documents record the purpose and process of defining specific characters in the CJK Symbols and Punctuation block:

See also 
 Hangul Jamo (Unicode block)
 Ideographic Symbols and Punctuation

References 

Unicode blocks
Punctuation
Chinese-language computing
Japanese-language computing
Korean-language computing